Long Beach Shortbus was an American reggae-influenced punk band from Long Beach, California, United States. The band consists of four regular members: RAS-1 (lead vocals and guitar), Trey Pangborn (guitar), Eric Wilson (bass guitar) and  Damion Ramirez (drums). Shortbus originated as a side project of RAS-1 and Eric Wilson, eventually taking shape after the Long Beach Dub Allstars disbanded in 2002.

Their first CD was a self-titled EP and featured their hit "California Grace." Their second CD was entitled Flying Ship of Fantasy, featuring tracks from their first album. "California Grace" is also available on the soundtrack to the MTV reality series Laguna Beach.  On October 7, 2007, it was announced that the band would be parting ways.  Their final show took place at the Haunted Ball And Chain festival in San Diego, California, on November 2 and 3. Eric Wilson is now in Sublime with Rome, a new incarnation of Sublime which chiefly performs songs by that band, and also features Rome Ramirez filling in for their late singer/guitarist Bradley Nowell.

Discography

Studio albums
 Long Beach Shortbus (2002)
 Flying Ship of Fantasy (2004)

Compilation albums
 ''Kingrock Entertainment "Listen Up, Volume No. 1" (2008)

See also
Sublime
Long Beach Dub Allstars

References

External links
Official Website
Official MySpace
Skunk Records
Long Beach Records
"California Grace" music video

American reggae musical groups
Punk rock groups from California
Reggae rock groups
Culture of Long Beach, California
Sublime (band)
Rock music supergroups
Musical groups established in 2002
2002 establishments in California